André Niederhäuser (born August 21, 1977) is a retired Swiss football defender.  he is the manager for the Under 17 team of BSC Young Boys.

During his career, Niederhäuser played for BSC Young Boys, FC Schaffhausen, FC Vaduz, SC Kriens, FC Luzern and FC Grenchen.

External links

1977 births
Living people
Association football defenders
Swiss men's footballers
BSC Young Boys players
FC Schaffhausen players
FC Vaduz players
Swiss expatriate footballers
Swiss expatriate sportspeople in Liechtenstein
Expatriate footballers in Liechtenstein
SC Kriens players
FC Luzern players
FC Grenchen players